Gilbert Deane may refer to:
 Gilbert Deane (priest), Anglican priest in Ireland
 Gilbert A. Deane, American politician from New York

See also
 Gilbert Dean, American lawyer and politician from New York